Phoenician may refer to:

 Phoenicia, an ancient civilization
 Phoenician alphabet
Phoenician (Unicode block)
 Phoenicianism, a form of Lebanese nationalism 
 Phoenician language
 List of Phoenician cities
 Phoenix, Arizona

See also

 Phoenix (mythology)
 Phoenix (disambiguation)
 Phoenicia (disambiguation)
 

Language and nationality disambiguation pages